Dublin Port Company (Irish: Comhlacht Chalafort Átha Cliath), formerly called the Dublin Port and Docks Board, is a self-financing semi-state company whose business is to manage Dublin Port, Ireland’s premier port. Established in 1997 as an independent company, Dublin Port Company is responsible for the management, control, operation and development of the port.

References

Companies based in Dublin (city)
Ports and harbours of the Republic of Ireland
Port authorities
State-sponsored bodies of the Republic of Ireland
Companies established in 1997
1997 establishments in Ireland
Dublin Docklands